The Chris Isaak Show is an American television sitcom that follows a fictionalized version of the life of American rock musician Chris Isaak. The show portrays Isaak and his band members as everyday people with everyday problems. The series was produced for the Showtime channel from 2001 to 2004, and was filmed in Vancouver, British Columbia, Canada, which stands in for the show's home setting of San Francisco.

The series featured Isaak and several members of his band, Silvertone, portraying themselves. Other roles were portrayed by actors, including Jed Rees as Isaak's keyboardist. Rees (who had studied piano, though much of his character's keyboard work is performed by a session player) was hired in place of Isaak's actual keyboardist Brett Tuggle (a part-time band member) to add some comedy to the show. Other characters featured on the show include Yola Gaylen, Isaak's manager and her colleague, Cody Kurtzman. The final regular character, Mona, appears lying nude on her stomach on a revolving circular bed in the basement of Bimbo's, a club Isaak frequents. Through an optical illusion created with mirrors she's made to look as if swimming in an aquarium, and being called a mermaid (despite having human legs). Only once does she sit up, revealing her toplessness. She typically talks only with Isaak, acting as his conscience or a sounding board for him.

Currently, the entire series remains unreleased to DVD due to music licensing costs.

Cast 
 Chris Isaak - Himself
 Kristin Dattilo - Yola Gaylen; manager
 Jed Rees - Anson Drubner; keyboardist
 Kenney Dale Johnson - Kenney Dale Johnson; drummer
 Rowland Salley - Rowland Salley; bassist
 Hershel Yatovitz - Hershel Yatovitz; guitarist
 Greg Winter - Cody Kurtzman
 BobbyJo Moore - Mona
 Jennifer Calvert - Vivian (Season One)
 Michelle Goh - Debbie Fung

Episodes

Season 1 (2001)

Season 2 (2002)

Season 3 (2004)

References

External links 
 

2000s American sitcoms
2001 American television series debuts
2004 American television series endings
English-language television shows
Cultural depictions of American men
Showtime (TV network) original programming
Television series by CBS Studios
Television series based on singers and musicians
Television shows filmed in Vancouver